Callitriche is a genus of largely aquatic plants known as water-starwort. Previously, it was the only genus in the family Callitrichaceae. However, according to the APG II system this family is now included in the Plantaginaceae (plantain family). The family name Callitrichaceae retains its status as nomen conservandum (name to be retained).

Species
Callitriche antarctica, Antarctic water-starwort
Callitriche brutia, pedunculate water starwort
Callitriche christensenii
Callitriche fassetti, Fassett's water starwort
Callitriche hamulata, intermediate water starwort
Callitriche hermaphroditica, autumn water starwort
Synonym  Callitriche autumnalis
Callitriche heterophylla, differentleaf water starwort
Synonym  Callitriche anceps, Callitriche bollanderi
Callitriche intermedia, narrowleaf water starwort
Callitriche japonica
Synonym  Callitriche nana
Callitriche longipedunculata, longstalk water starwort
Callitriche marginata, winged water starwort
Synonym  Callitriche sepulta
Callitriche muelleri
Callitriche obtusangula, blunt-fruited water starwort
Callitriche palustris, spiny water starwort
Synonym  Callitriche verna
Callitriche pedunculosa, Nuttall's water starwort
Synonym  Callitriche nuttallii
Callitriche peploides, matted water starwort
Callitriche petrieri
Callitriche platycarpa, various-leaved water starwort
Callitriche pulchra, beautiful water starwort
Callitriche sonderi
Synonym  Callitriche capricorni
Callitriche stagnalis, pond water starwort
Callitriche terrestris, terrestrial water starwort
Synonym  Callitriche austinii, Callitriche deflexa
Callitriche trochlearis, effluent water starwort
Callitriche truncata, short-leaved water starwort
Callitriche umbonata
Callitriche verna

Phylogeny and evolution
The first molecular phylogeny of the aquatic genus of 50 species discerned three clades: Clade A (three species, widespread); Clade C (10 species, New World); Clade D (six species, Europe). The parsimony analyses revealed that aneuploid reduction (n=5 to 4) and polyploidy (n=5 to 10) have evolved at least twice in the genus, whereas the obligately submersed growth habit and hypohydrophily have evolved once.

References

https://web.archive.org/web/20020806205418/http://www.usa.sp2000.org/AnnualChecklist2000.html

Notes

Further reading
Callitriche platycarpa Recorded from Eglinton Canal, Galway, Ireland. Pybus, C. and O'Halloran, P. 2009. Distribution of some submerged aquatic macrophytes in the Eglinton Canal, Galway. Ir. Nat. J. 30: 51 - 53.

External links

Callitrichaceae of Mongolia in FloraGREIF

 
Freshwater plants
Plantaginaceae genera